Somera is a genus of moths of the family Notodontidae. The genus was erected by Francis Walker in 1855.

Species
Somera virens Dierl, 1976
Somera viridifusca Walker, 1855 – prominent moth
Somera viriviri Kobayashi, 2012

References
 , 2012: New Notodontidae species in Southeast Asia (2) (Lepidoptera: Notodontidae). Tinea 22 (1): 6-11.
 , 2001, New and less known Notodontidae from mainland China Neue Entomologische Nachrichten band 50: 1-141.
 , 2008, Palaearctic Macrolepidoptera Volume 1: 1-482. Notodontidae

External links

Notodontidae